Lactic acidosis is a medical condition characterized by a build-up of lactate (especially -lactate) in the body, with formation of an excessively low pH in the bloodstream. It is a form of metabolic acidosis, in which excessive acid accumulates due to a problem with the body's oxidative metabolism.

Lactic acidosis is typically the result of an underlying acute or chronic medical condition, medication, or poisoning. The symptoms are generally attributable to these underlying causes, but may include nausea, vomiting, Kussmaul breathing (laboured and deep), and generalised weakness.

The diagnosis is made on biochemical analysis of blood (often initially on arterial blood gas samples), and once confirmed, generally prompts an investigation to establish the underlying cause to treat the acidosis. In some situations, hemofiltration (purification of the blood) is temporarily required. In rare chronic forms of lactic acidosis caused by mitochondrial disease, a specific diet or dichloroacetate may be used. The prognosis of lactic acidosis depends largely on the underlying cause; in some situations (such as severe infections), it indicates an increased risk of death.

Classification 
The Cohen–Woods classification categorizes causes of lactic acidosis as:
 Type A: Decreased tissue oxygenation (e.g., from decreased blood flow)
 Type B
 B1: Underlying diseases (sometimes causing type A)
 B2: Medication or intoxication
 B3: Inborn error of metabolism

Signs and symptoms 
Lactic acidosis is commonly found in people who are unwell, such as those with severe heart and/or lung disease, a severe infection with sepsis, the systemic inflammatory response syndrome due to another cause, severe physical trauma, or severe depletion of body fluids. Symptoms in humans include all those of typical metabolic acidosis (nausea, vomiting, generalized muscle weakness, and laboured and deep breathing).

Causes 
The several different causes of lactic acidosis include:
 Genetic conditions
 Biotinidase deficiency, multiple carboxylase deficiency, or nongenetic deficiencies of biotin
 Diabetes mellitus and deafness
 Fructose 1,6-bisphosphatase deficiency
 Glucose-6-phosphatase deficiency
 GRACILE syndrome
 Mitochondrial encephalomyopathy, lactic acidosis, and stroke-like episodes
 Pyruvate dehydrogenase deficiency
 Pyruvate carboxylase deficiency
 Leigh syndrome
 Drugs
 Linezolid
 Paracetamol/acetaminophen poisoning
 Metformin: this risk is low (less than 10 cases for 100,000 patient years), but the risk of metformin-induced lactic acidosis (MALA) increases in certain situations where both the plasma levels of metformin are increased and lactate clearance is impaired. The older related and now withdrawn drug phenformin carried a much higher risk of lactic acidosis.
 Isoniazid toxicity
 Propofol
 Epinephrine
 Propylene glycol (D-lactic acidosis)
 Nucleoside reverse-transcriptase inhibitors
 Abacavir/dolutegravir/lamivudine
 Emtricitabine/tenofovir
 Potassium cyanide (cyanide poisoning)
 Fialuridine
 Other
 Thiamine deficiency (especially during TPN)
 Impaired delivery of oxygen to cells in the tissues (e.g., from impaired blood flow (hypoperfusion))
 Bleeding
 Polymyositis
 Ethanol toxicity
 Sepsis
 Shock
 Advanced liver disease
 Diabetic ketoacidosis
 Excessive exercise (overtraining)
 Regional hypoperfusion (e.g., bowel ischemia or marked cellulitis)
 Cancers such as Non-Hodgkin's and Burkitt lymphomas
 Pheochromocytoma
 Tumor lysis syndrome
 D-lactic acidosis due to intestinal bacterial flora production in short gut syndrome

Pathophysiology 
Glucose metabolism begins with glycolysis, in which the molecule is broken down into pyruvate in ten enzymatic steps. A significant proportion of pyruvate is converted into lactate (usually 10:1). The human metabolism produces about 20 mmol/kg of lactic acid every 24 hours. This happens predominantly in tissues (especially muscle) that have high levels of the "A" isoform of the enzyme lactate dehydrogenase (LDHA), which predominantly converts pyruvate into lactate. The lactate is carried by the bloodstream to other tissues where it is converted at the expense of ATP back to pyruvate by the "B" isoform of LDH (LDHB). Firstly there is gluconeogenesis in the liver (as well as the kidney and some other tissues), where pyruvate is converted into glucose; this is known as the Cori cycle. In addition, lactate moved to other tissues enters the citric acid cycle and eventually oxidative phosphorylation, a process that yields ATP.

Elevations in lactate are either a consequence of increased production or of decreased metabolism. With regards to metabolism, this predominantly takes place in the liver (70%), which explains that lactate levels may be elevated in the setting of liver disease.

In "type A" lactic acidosis, the production of lactate is attributable to insufficient oxygen for aerobic metabolism. If there is no oxygen available for the parts of the glucose metabolism that require oxygen (citric acid cycle and oxidative phosphorylation), excess pyruvate will be converted in excess lactate. In "type B" lactic acidosis the lactate accumulates because there is a mismatch between glycolysis activity and the remainder of glucose metabolism. Examples are situations where the sympathetic nervous system is highly active (e.g. severe asthma). There is controversy as to whether elevated lactate in acute illness can be attributed to tissue hypoxia; there is limited empirical support for this theoretical notion.

Diagnosis
Acid-base disturbances such as lactic acidosis are typically first assessed using arterial blood gas tests. Testing of venous blood is also available as an alternative as they are effectively interchangeable. Normally resulting lactate concentrations are in the range indicated below:

Lactic acidosis is classically defined as an elevated lactate together with pH < 7.35 and bicarbonate below 20 mmol/L, but this is not required as lactic acidosis may exist together with other acid-base abnormalities that may affect these two parameters.

Treatment
If elevated lactate is present in acute illness, supporting the oxygen supply and blood flow are key initial steps. Some vasopressors (drugs that augment the blood pressure) are less effective when lactate levels are high, and some agents that stimulate the beta-2 adrenergic receptor can elevate the lactate further.

Direct removal of lactate from the body (e.g. with hemofiltration or dialysis) is difficult, with limited evidence for benefit; it may not be possible to keep up with the lactate production.

Limited evidence supports the use of sodium bicarbonate solutions to improve the pH (which is associated with increased carbon dioxide generation and may reduce the calcium levels).

Lactic acidosis caused by inherited mitochondrial disorders (type B3) may be treated with a ketogenic diet and possibly with dichloroacetate (DCA), although this may be complicated by peripheral neuropathy and has a weak evidence base.

Prognosis
Mild and transient elevations in lactate have limited impact on mortality, whereas sustained and severe lactate elevations are associated with a high mortality.

The mortality of lactic acidosis in people taking metformin was previously reported to be 50%, but in more recent reports this was closer to 25%.

Other animals

Reptiles
Reptiles, which rely primarily on anaerobic energy metabolism (glycolysis) for intense movements, can be particularly susceptible to lactic acidosis.  In particular, during the capture of large crocodiles, the animals' use of their glycolytic muscles often alter the blood's pH to a point where they are unable to respond to stimuli or move.  Cases are recorded in which particularly large crocodiles which put up extreme resistance to capture later died of the resulting pH imbalance.

Certain turtle species have been found to be capable of tolerating high levels of lactic acid without experiencing the effects of lactic acidosis. Painted turtles hibernate buried in mud or underwater and do not resurface for the entire winter. As a result, they rely on anaerobic respiration to provide the majority of their energy needs. Adaptations in particular in the turtle's blood composition and shell allow it to tolerate high levels of lactic acid accumulation. In the anoxic conditions where anaerobic respiration is dominant, calcium levels in the blood plasma increase. This calcium serves as a buffer, reacting with the excess lactate to form the precipitate calcium lactate. This precipitate is suggested to be reabsorbed by the shell and skeleton, thereby removing it from the bloodstream; studies examining turtles that have been subjected to prolonged anoxic conditions have up to 45% of their lactate stored within their skeletal structure.

Ruminants
In ruminant livestock, the cause of clinically serious lactic acidosis is different from the causes described above.

In domesticated ruminants, lactic acidosis may occur as a consequence of ingesting large amounts of grain, especially when the rumen population is poorly adapted to deal with grain.  Activity of various rumen organisms results in accumulation of various volatile fatty acids (normally, mostly acetic, propionic, and butyric acids), which are partially dissociated.  Although some lactate is normally produced in the rumen, it is normally metabolized by such organisms as Megasphaera elsdenii and, to a lesser extent, Selenomonas ruminantium and some other organisms.  With high grain consumption, the concentration of dissociated organic acids can become quite high, resulting in rumen pH dropping below 6.  Within this lower pH range, Lactobacillus spp. (producing lactate and hydrogen ions) are favored, and M. elsdenii and S. ruminantium are inhibited, tending to result in a considerable rise of lactate and hydrogen ion concentrations in the rumen fluid.  The pKa of lactic acid is low, about 3.9, versus, for example, 4.8 for acetic acid; this contributes to the considerable drop in rumen pH which can occur.

Because of the high solute concentration of the rumen fluid under such conditions, considerable water is translocated from the blood to the rumen along the osmotic potential gradient, resulting in dehydration which cannot be relieved by drinking, and which can ultimately lead to hypovolemic shock.  As more lactate accumulates and rumen pH drops, the ruminal concentration of undissociated lactic acid increases.  Undissociated lactic acid can cross the rumen wall to the blood, where it dissociates, lowering blood pH.  Both L and D isomers of lactic acid are produced in the rumen; these isomers are metabolized by different metabolic pathways, and activity of the principal enzyme involved in metabolism of the D isomer declines greatly with lower pH, tending to result in an increased ratio of D:L isomers as acidosis progresses.

Measures for preventing lactic acidosis in ruminants include avoidance of excessive amounts of grain in the diet, and gradual introduction of grain over a period of several days, to develop a rumen population capable of safely dealing with a relatively high grain intake.  Administration of lasalocid or monensin in feed can reduce risk of lactic acidosis in ruminants,  inhibiting most of the lactate-producing bacterial species without inhibiting the major lactate fermenters.  Also, using a higher feeding frequency to provide the daily grain ration can allow higher grain intake without reducing the pH of the rumen fluid.

Treatment of lactic acidosis in ruminants may involve intravenous administration of dilute sodium bicarbonate, oral administration of magnesium hydroxide, and/or repeated removal of rumen fluids and replacement with water (followed by reinoculation with rumen organisms, if necessary).

References

External links 

Acid–base disturbances